Jacques de Flesselles (11 November 173014 July 1789) was a French official and one of the early victims of the French Revolution.

Early life
Jacques de Flesselles was born in Paris in 1730 of a family of middle-class origins, which had recently achieved nobility status. His father, also Jacques de Flesselles, was a financial official who had served as a royal adviser. The younger Jacques de Flesselles followed a similar career path.

Career
Following appointments as Intendant of Moulins in 1762 and of Rennes in 1765, de Flesselles served as Intendant of Lyon (1768–1784) where he won respect as a reform-minded royal official. Motivated by a personal interest in scientific development, he sponsored  a Montgolfier balloon in 1784, named the Flesselles in his honour. 

On 21 April 1789, de Flesselles became the last provost of the merchants of Paris, a post roughly equivalent to mayor. Three months later he faced a chaotic situation as widespread disturbances broke out and the withdrawal of royal troops left a vacuum of authority in central Paris.

Outbreak of the Revolution
On 13 July 1789, de Flesselles received demands for weapons to equip a citizens militia being organized to restore order. He was able to provide only three muskets from municipal stocks, and his suggestions of where other stores could be found proved misleading or mistaken. Immediately following the storming of the Bastille on 14 July, de Flesselles found himself accused of royalist sympathies by an infuriated throng surrounding the Paris City Hall. De Flesselles was shot dead by an unknown hand on the steps of the City Hall, while trying to justify his actions, and his body decapitated. De Flesselles was one of several representatives of the ancien régime killed that day.

See also
 Bernard-René Jourdan de Launay

Notes and references

1730 births
1789 deaths
Businesspeople from Paris
Mayors of Paris
People killed in the French Revolution
Provost of the Merchants of Paris